Lucy van Dael (born in 1946) is a Dutch baroque violinist and member of the faculty of the Amsterdam Conservatory. Her principal violin studies were at the Royal Conservatory in The Hague.

Originally a classically trained violinist, she began her career with the Netherlands Chamber Orchestra before pursuing baroque violin studies.

She has collaborated extensively with Gustav Leonhardt, Frans Brüggen, and Ton Koopman, co-founded the Orchestra of the 18th Century with Frans Brüggen, and has conducted or performed with many other baroque ensembles, including:
 European Union Baroque Orchestra
 Concerto d'Amsterdam
 Irish Baroque Orchestra
 Beethoven Akademie
 Academia Montis Regalis
 Leonhardt Consort
 La Petite Bande

References

External links 
 Lucy van Dael
 Orchestra of the 18th Century
 Amsterdam Conservatory

1946 births
Living people
Dutch classical violinists
Baroque-violin players
Academic staff of the Conservatorium van Amsterdam
Royal Conservatory of The Hague alumni
Women classical violinists
Dutch performers of early music
Women performers of early music
21st-century classical violinists
21st-century women musicians